The Chiang Mai National Museum is a national museum located in Chiang Mai, northern Thailand. It highlights the history of the Kingdom of Lanna with descriptions in both Thai and English. The museum is located in the vicinity of Wat Chet Yot, in the north-western part of Chiang Mai. It is run by the Fine Arts Department of Thailand.

Literature

External links 
 Chiang Mai National Museum

Museums in Chiang Mai
National museums of Thailand